Siniša is a South Slavic masculine given name of medieval Serbian origin. It may refer to:

Simeon Uroš "Siniša" (1326–1371), Serbian ruler of Epirus and Thessaly
Siniša Branković (born 1979), Serbian soccer player
Siniša Dobrasinović (born 1977), Montenegrin-born Cypriot football player
Sinişa Dragin (born 1960), Serbian-Romanian film director
Siniša Đurić (born 1976), Bosnian Serb football manager and former player
Siniša Ergotić (born 1968), Croatian long jumper
Siniša Gagula (born 1984), Bosnian football player
Siniša Glavašević (1960–1991), Croatian reporter who was killed in the Battle of Vukovar
Siniša Gogić (born 1963), Serbian and Cypriot football striker
Siniša Janković (born 1978), Serbian football forward
Siniša Kelečević (born 1970), Croatian basketball player
Siniša Kovačević (born 1954), Serbian author and playwright, professor of the Belgrade Academy of Arts
Siniša Linić (born 1982), Croatian football midfielder
Sinisa Malesevic MRIA (born 1969), political/historical sociologist at the University College, Dublin
Siniša Mihajlović (born 1969), Serbian former football player turned manager
Siniša Mulina (born 1973), Bosnia and Herzegovina international footballer
Siniša Oreščanin (born 1972), Croatian football manager
Siniša Radanović (born 1979), Serbian central defender
Siniša Saničanin (born 1995), Bosnian footballer
Siniša Skelin (born 1974), Croatian rower who has won two Olympic medals
Siniša Školneković (born 1968), former Croatian water polo player
Siniša Stevanović (born 1989), Serbian footballer
Siniša Ubiparipović (born 1983), Serbian-American footballer
Siniša Vuco (born 1971), Croatian singer and songwriter

See also
John Sinisa, Tongan rugby league player
Siniša Broćeta Serbian humanists in Milan (Italy)

References

Slavic masculine given names
Serbian masculine given names
Croatian masculine given names